Mykhailo Ulyanovych Bilyi (12 November 1922 – 5 August 2001) was a Ukrainian and Soviet politician, who served as the Chairman of the Verkhovna Rada of the Ukrainian Soviet Socialist Republic from 1972 to 1980. Since 1969 he was a Corresponding Member of the National Academy of Sciences of Ukraine (then the Academy of Sciences of Ukrainian SSR).

Biography
Mykhailo Bilyi was born in a village of Moskali that today is located in Chernihiv Raion, Northern Ukraine.

References

External links
 Yarmysh, Yu. Kyiv National University of Taras Shevchenko: 170 years. Institute of Journalism (Kyiv University).
 Profile at the Science Society of students and aspirants. Faculty of Physics of the Kyiv University.

1922 births
2001 deaths
20th-century Ukrainian physicists
21st-century Ukrainian politicians
People from Chernihiv Oblast
People from Chernigov Governorate
Taras Shevchenko National University of Kyiv alumni
Communist Party of Ukraine (Soviet Union) politicians
Soviet leaders of Ukraine
Recipients of the Order of Friendship of Peoples
Recipients of the Order of Lenin
Recipients of the Order of Prince Yaroslav the Wise, 5th class
Recipients of the Order of the Red Banner of Labour
Chairmen of the Verkhovna Rada of the Ukrainian Soviet Socialist Republic
Eighth convocation members of the Verkhovna Rada of the Ukrainian Soviet Socialist Republic
Ninth convocation members of the Verkhovna Rada of the Ukrainian Soviet Socialist Republic
Tenth convocation members of the Verkhovna Rada of the Ukrainian Soviet Socialist Republic
Rectors of Taras Shevchenko National University of Kyiv
Burials at Baikove Cemetery